South Armagh was a constituency of the Parliament of Northern Ireland.

Boundaries
South Armagh was a county constituency comprising the southern part of County Armagh. It was created when the House of Commons (Method of Voting and Redistribution of Seats) Act (Northern Ireland) 1929 introduced first-past-the-post elections throughout Northern Ireland. South Armagh was created by the division of Armagh into four new constituencies. The constituency survived unchanged, returning one Member of Parliament, until the Parliament of Northern Ireland was temporarily suspended in 1972, and then formally abolished in 1973.

The seat was made up from parts of the rural districts of Armagh and Newry, with the town of Keady.

Politics 
The seat had a significant Nationalist majority, but Labour candidates were sometimes polled well.

The remainder of contested elections involved candidates of different Nationalist persuasions.

Members of Parliament

Election results 

At the 1938 Northern Ireland general election, Paddy Agnew was elected unopposed.

At the 1953 Northern Ireland general election, Charles McGleenan was elected unopposed.

References

Historic constituencies in County Armagh
Northern Ireland Parliament constituencies established in 1929
Constituencies of the Northern Ireland Parliament
Northern Ireland Parliament constituencies disestablished in 1973